Max Botkin is an American screenwriter and producer. Botkin's original script for What Happened to Monday? was featured on the 2010 Blacklist for best unproduced screenplays in Hollywood.

Career
He began writing for TV with Wolverine and the X-Men. What Happened to Monday? was filmed by Tommy Wirkola and starred Noomi Rapace, Glenn Close, and Willem Dafoe. The film was released theatrically in Europe and Asia and Netflix bought the streaming rights to the film for the United States as well as the U.K. and Latin America. He also wrote Robosapien: Rebooted (originally scheduled to be released in 2009, the film was released in the US on May 28, 2013) and Opposite Day. 

In 2015, Max solid his original screenplay Ponce to Lionsgate/Pantelion and is executive producing, with Eugenio Derbez attached to star, produce and direct. In April 2017, Botkin inked a deal with award-winning multimedia company 1stAvenueMachine to produce films with them through a first of its kind directors incubator. In 2016, he co-wrote Show Dogs. The film was released in the United States on May 18, 2018, directed by Raja Gosnell.

Show Dogs controversy 
The film Show Dogs was criticized for plot themes which involve humans fondling the genitals of the main character, a dog, against his will. In the film, other characters "teach" him not to think about it and to go to his "zen place" whenever that happens. Prior to release, an online magazine Macaroni Kid reviewed a test screening for the film. Spurred on by this review, other professional reviewers agreed that the child-grooming implications were "disturbing and serious". Botkin says he did not write those scenes, that the original script was "heavily rewritten by 13 other writers", and strongly condemned the themes in question.

In response, Global Road Entertainment, the film's distributor, announced they were re-cutting the film and resubmitting it to theaters in time for its second weekend. The company said:

References

External links
 
 

Living people
American film producers
American male screenwriters
21st-century American male writers
Year of birth missing (living people)
21st-century American screenwriters